Big Money is a 1930 American comedy-drama film directed by Russell Mack and starring Eddie Quillan, Robert Armstrong, and James Gleason. It was produced and distributed by Pathé Exchange, shortly before the company was completely absorbed by RKO.

The film's sets were designed by the art director Carroll Clark.

Synopsis
A message boy from a brokerage house ends up having to take care of $50,000 overnight.

Cast 
 Eddie Quillan as Eddie 
 Robert Armstrong as Ace 
 James Gleason as Tom 
 Margaret Livingston as Mae 
 Miriam Seegar as Joan McCall 
 Robert Edeson as Mr. McCall 
 Dorothy Christy as Leila 
 G. Pat Collins as Smiley 
 Morgan Wallace as Durkin 
 Myrtis Crinley as Flora
 Robert Gleckler as Monk 
 Charles Sellon as Bradley 
 Kit Guard as Lefty
 Johnnie Morris as Weejee 
 Frank Sabini as Waiter
 Clara Palmer as Society Woman
 Spec O'Donnell as Elevator Boy 
 Mona Rico as Maid 
 Murray Smith as Izzy
 Jack McDonald as Butler 
 Zita Moulton as Michael
 Jack Hanlon as Office Boy 
 Richard Cramer as Detroit Dan 
 Maurice Black as Lewis Wilder 
 Edgar Dearing as Detective 
 Harry Semels as Waiter
 Harry Tyler as Wendell

References

Bibliography
 Munden, Kenneth White. The American Film Institute Catalog of Motion Pictures Produced in the United States, Part 1. University of California Press, 1997.

External links
 

1930 films
1930 comedy-drama films
American comedy-drama films
Pathé Exchange films
Films directed by Russell Mack
American black-and-white films
1930s English-language films
1930s American films